
Schmear is a word of Germanic origin, equivalent to "smear" or "spread" (usually fat or butter).
In some Germanic languages, the cognate of smear itself means butter (c.f. smör/smør in the North Germanic languages).

The use and spelling of schmear or shmear in American English is a direct loanword from Yiddish, where its original usage referred to cheese. In modern usage it has extended to anything that can be spread, such as cream cheese spread upon a bagel.
In some cases, it refers to "an entire set or group of related things", or the expression "the whole shmear". It can also refer to bribery, as a "little extra" spread on top.

In card games such as Schafkopf, Pinochle or Sheepshead, schmearing is to play a high-scoring card to a trick in the hope that one's partner will win it (see schmear (cards)).

As a slang term, the word  in Yiddish can also refer to a slap on the face, primarily when disciplining young children.

Origin 

Before 900; (v.) Middle English: smeren, smirien to rub with fat, anoint; Old English: smirian, smerian, smerwan; cognate with Dutch: ; German: , Yiddish: שמירן, Icelandic: , Old Norse: smyrja, smyrwa; (noun) in current senses derivative of the verb; compare obsolete smear: fat, grease, ointment; Middle English: smere; Old English: smeoru; cognate with Dutch: ; German: , Old Norse: smjǫr, Swedish: smör – butter; Danish and Norwegian: smør – butter; Greek:  – rubbing powder.

See also
Bagel and cream cheese
List of English words of Yiddish origin
Cream cheese

References

External links

Ashkenazi Jewish cuisine
Cheese dishes
Yiddish culture